is the second highest-grossing pizza chain in Japan after Domino's Pizza.

The company's slogan is "All the taste and toppings you want on a pizza, straight from our oven to your door!"

The company's mascot is Pizza-La-Kun. The name of the company combines "pizza" and "Godzilla".

History
Hidenori Asano, the chairman of Four Seeds Inc. (Pizza-La's parent company), was inspired to create the chain after viewing E.T. the Extra-Terrestrial in which Domino's Pizza featured, though he had previously planned to make it an offshoot of Domino's Pizza itself as a directly managed store, rather than one managed by a franchise. However, the company had already applied for franchising rights in Japan in 1985 and had already started business. Asano decided then to establish his own chain, and in April 1987 the first Pizza-La store was opened in the Mejiro district of Toshima, Tokyo. Its expansion into the national market began in December 1989 starting with the store  in the Tsuchizaki district of Akita, Akita. Commercials for Pizza-La began in 1991 using the slogan "ピザーラお届け!!" (Pizza-La Delivery!!) incorporating a variety of actors. By 2012 Pizza-La had opened 552 stores in Japan, and by 2015 the chain had expanded into all prefectures excluding Aomori, Fukui, Tottori, Shimane, Kagawa, Ehime, Kochi, Saga and Ōita prefectures.

Sponsored stores
The Fuji-Q Highland theme park has a Pizza-La store next to the "Tondemina" pendulum ride, which offers a themed pizza with sausages placed to make it resemble the rotating disk. Due to the attraction's resemblance to a pizza, the Pizza-La logo is printed onto the pendulum arm that supports the disk.

In addition, on October 5, 2006, the KidZania branch in Tokyo first provided a pizza preparation activity sponsored by Pizza-La.

Sporting events
Pizza-La is a former sponsor of Bowling Revolution P★League.

Public health incident
On August 24, 2013, images in which two part-time employees of Pizza-La's Higashiyamato branch in Tokyo posed inside its sink and refrigerator were released onto the Internet. On the same day they were found to have gone viral on Twitter and several bulletin boards. The following day a public apology was made by the company, and the Higashiyamato branch was temporarily closed while disposal of preserved foods and disinfection of the sink and refrigerator began. As of August 30 the two employees were fired. The company that acted as a franchisee of the Higashiyamato branch had lost consumer trust due to the incident and suspended business in October 2015. On July 27, 2016, the company began bankruptcy proceedings with the Tokyo District Court.

It was also found that said employees had released images of themselves squatting on display shelves and inside refrigeration cabinets at the Seiyu supermarket in Ōme, Tokyo a day before the incident, on August 23.

In popular culture
 In Yakuza 0, there is a substory where Kazuma Kiryu orders a special combination pizza from Pizza-La and delivers it to a foreign woman.
 In the anime, My Hero Academia, the police pretended to be a delivery man for Pizza-La before busting in to the League of Villains Hideout.

References

External links

  
 Pizza-La menu 
  

Restaurants established in 1980
Japanese companies established in 1980
Retail companies based in Tokyo
Food and drink companies based in Tokyo
Minato, Tokyo
Pizza chains of Japan
Pizza franchises
Restaurants in Japan